Ángel Infante Cruz (Acaponeta, Nayarit, México; 1 October 1914 – Ciudad de México 15 December 1987) was a popular Mexican actor and singer of the Golden Age of Mexican cinema. He appeared in more than 120 films, 47 of which were great successes. In more than 30 films he appeared alongside his brother, the actor and singer Pedro Infante, who died in an aviation accident in 1957. Ángel Infante was known for having visited Cuba on eight occasions, and even having presented his pistols as a gift to Fidel Castro. His daughter is the TV actress Sonia Infante. He appeared in films such as The Two Orphans, Corner Stop, Women's Prison, Here Comes Martin Corona, My General's Women, Full Speed Ahead, What Has That Woman Done to You?, The Atomic Fireman, and Love for Sale.

Filmography 
 1948  Flor de caña 
 1948  Ustedes los ricos ... Man who fights with Pepe (uncredited) 
 1948  Enrédate y verás
 1948  Esquina, bajan...! ... Menchaca 'Rayito de Sol' 
 1949  El gran Calavera ... Employee of Ramiro (uncredited) 
 1949  Canta y no llores... (uncredited) 
 1949  Cara sucia 
 1949  Dicen que soy mujeriego ... Man in the cantina (uncredited) 
 1949  El abandonado ... Gambler (uncredited) 
 1949  El charro y la dama 
 1949  El gran campeón ... Friend of Jorge (uncredited) 
 1949  El seminarista ... Bus passenger (uncredited) 
 1949  En cada puerto un amor (uncredited) 
 1949  Hay lugar para... dos ... Menchaca 
 1949  La hija del penal ... Policeman (uncredited) 
 1949  La mujer que yo perdí ... Marcial 
 1949  Las puertas del presidio ... Marcial, el Plegao (uncredited) 
 1949  No me quieras tanto... ... Hotel employee (uncredited) 
 1950  Las dos huerfanitas ... Hospital employee (uncredited) 
 1950  Piña madura 
 1950  Cuatro contra el mundo ... Manejador de cervecería 
 1950  Donde nacen los pobres 
 1950  Duelo en las montañas ... Train conductor (uncredited) 
 1950  Guardián, el perro salvador
 1950  La dama del alba ... Anselmo (uncredited) 
 1950  La posesión ... Rubén 
 1950  Nuestras vidas
 1950 Pata de palo ... Manuel, mayordomo (uncredited) 
 1950  Pecado de ser pobre ... Factory employee (uncredited) 
 1951  A.T.M. A toda máquina! ... Comandante 
 1951  Amor vendido ...  Waiter (uncredited) 
 1951  El siete machos ... Don Guadalupe 
 1951  Las mujeres de mi general ... Sarmiento, el traidor 
 1951  Noche de perdición ... Miembro criminal (uncredited) 
 1951  ¡¿Qué te ha dado esa mujer?! ... Comandante 
 1951  Capitán de rurales ... Rendón 
 1951  Cárcel de mujeres ... Gloria's husband (uncredited) 
 1951  Corazón de fiera ... Benjamín 
 1951  El papelerito ... Driver (uncredited) 
 1951  Ella y yo... Friend of Pedro 
 1951  La estatua de carne (uncredited) 
 1951  La marquesa del barrio ... Zacatecas 
 1951  Pecado ... Invitado (uncredited) 
 1951  Peregrina (uncredited) 
 1951  Sentenciado a muerte 
 1951  Tierra baja ... Pepe 
 1952  Dancing, Salón de baile ... Police detective 
 1952  El bombero atómico ... Policeman
 1952  Una mujer sin amor ... González (uncredited) 
 1952  Ahí viene Martín Corona ... Lencho 
 1952  Dos caras tiene el destino ... Esbirro de Salcedo 
 1952  El beisbolista fenómeno ... Ramón 
 1952  El enamorado ... Nacho 
 1952  El lobo solitario... Raymundo 
 1952  Hay un niño en su futuro (uncredited) 
 1952  Necesito dinero ... Roberto 
 1952  Por ellas aunque mal paguen ... José Manuel Campos 
 1952  Siempre tuya 
 1953  Esos de Pénjamo ... Enrique 
 1954  La sobrina del señor cura ... Tomá Rendón (el Tomasón) 
 1955  Tu vida entre mis manos ... Doctor Pérez 
 1956  Los gavilanes ... Roberto 
 1957  La justicia del gavilán vengador ... Jesús 
 1957 La ley de la sierra
 1958   Aquí está Heraclio Bernal ... Antonio Bernal 
 1958  El gran premio ... Fernando González 
 1958  El rayo de Sinaloa: La venganza de Heraclio Bernal 
 1958  La guarida del buitre 
 1958  La rebelión de la sierra 
 1958  Los muertos no hablan ... Mayor 
 1958  Los tres vivales ... Ángel Vaca 
 1959  Yo... el aventurero ... Gregorio Carriles 
 1960  Bala de Plata ... Regino 
 1960  Dos gallos en palenque
 1960 Me importa poco
 1961  El gato ... Don Pedro Herrera 
 1961 Los inocentes 
 1961  Tirando a matar 
 1964  El rostro de la muerte ... Comisario 
 1964  La banda del fantasma negro
 1964  Yo, el valiente
 1966  La vida de Pedro Infante ... Voz de Pedro 
 1974  El desconocido ... Don Julio

References

External links

1914 births
1987 deaths
Male actors from Nayarit
20th-century Mexican male singers